The Jinnah Polytechnic Institute (JPI) is a private polytechnic institute located in Faisalabad, Punjab, Pakistan.

Academics

Diploma of Associate Engineering (DAE) programs
The college offers 3-year Diploma of Associate Engineering (DAE) programs in following disciplines:
 Civil Technology
 Electrical Technology
 Mechanical Technology
 Electronics Technology
 Architecture Technology
 Instrument Technology

Bachelor's programs
The college also offers following bachelor's degree programs:

 BS Electrical Engineering Technology
 BS Mechanical Engineering Technology
 BS Civil Engineering Technology
 BS Computer Science

See also 
Government College of Technology, Faisalabad

References

External links
Official website

Universities and colleges in Faisalabad District
Vocational education in Pakistan
Memorials to Muhammad Ali Jinnah